Malkoçoğlu Bali Bey (1495–1548), also known as Malkoç Bey, was an Ottoman military commander and governor, serving Suleiman the Magnificent. The son of Malkoçoğlu Yaya Pasha who had served as Beylerbey of Anatolia and Rumelia and attained the rank of vizier, marrying a daughter of Bayezid II in 1501, Hümaşah Sultan. His younger brother was Malkoçoğlu Mehmet Bey. He distinguished himself at the Battle of Mohács (1526). He then served as the governor (beylerbey) of the Budin Eyalet after 1541. Balı Bey was the commander of akıncı and gazis.

He was portrayed by Cüneyt Arkın classic movie series in Malkoçoğlu and actor Burak Özçivit in the Muhteşem Yüzyıl (2011–14) series.

See also
Malkoçoğlu family

References

Sources

Muslims from the Ottoman Empire
Governors of the Ottoman Empire
16th-century Ottoman military personnel
1495 births
1548 deaths